Euonychodes is a monotypic moth genus of the family Noctuidae. Its only species, Euonychodes albivenata, is found in South Africa. Both the genus and species were first described by Warren in 1914.

References

Endemic moths of South Africa
Catocalinae
Monotypic moth genera